The United States Air Force's 147th Air Support Operations Squadron is a combat support unit located at Ellington Field Joint Reserve Base, Houston, Texas. The 147th provides tactical command and control of air power assets to the Joint Forces Air Component Commander and Joint Forces Land Component Commander for combat operations.

State Partnership Program 
The SPP evolved from a 1991 U.S. European Command decision to set up the Joint Contact Team Program in the Baltic Region with Reserve component Soldiers and Airmen. A subsequent National Guard Bureau proposal paired U.S. states with three nations emerging from the former Soviet Bloc and the SPP was born, becoming a key U.S. security cooperation tool, facilitating cooperation across all aspects of international civil-military affairs and encouraging people-to-people ties at the state level."

Texas Partnerships,
Czech Republic 1993-present,
Chile 2008-present

External links 

Air support operations squadrons of the United States Air Force